The Harbin Z-20 (Chinese: 直-20; official codename Chinese: “神雕”, "Divine Eagle") is a Chinese medium-lift utility helicopter produced by the Harbin Aircraft Industry Group (HAIG). The Z-20 can operate from locations above  in altitude as well as from the Liaoning aircraft carrier. It is regarded to be comparable in performance to the US-made Sikorsky UH-60 Black Hawk helicopter, of which the civilian Sikorsky S-70C-2 variant has been used by the People's Liberation Army since 1984.

Development
The People's Liberation Army Air Force (PLAAF) has had a requirement for a high-altitude medium utility helicopter that can operate in the mountainous regions in China since the 1980s. In 1984, the PLAAF acquired 24 Sikorsky S-70C-2s with enhanced General Electric T700-701A engines from the US government.

China was unable to purchase more Sikorsky aircraft following the fallout from the 1989 Tiananmen Square protests that resulted in an EU and US arms embargo. This led to the development of an indigenous so-called "10-tonne helicopter project" that started in 2006, and the Z-20 made its first flight on 23 December 2013.

Helicopter production in China received a massive boost after the 2008 Sichuan earthquakes highlighted the value of helicopters in humanitarian missions. In addition to the PLAAF, the Z-20 will likely be used by other services in the People's Liberation Army. It could fill the role of a multi-role naval helicopter for the People's Liberation Army Navy (PLAN) that is small enough to be interoperable across all PLAN vessels while still have a full suite of anti-submarine warfare (ASW) capabilities installed.

The Z-20 has been tested carrying missiles on wing pylons. A stealth Z-20 variant has been indicated under development since 2015. One analyst said China could produce the stealth variant relatively easily because of their access to a modified MH-60 Black Hawk tail section, recovered by Pakistani security forces after a crash during the Bin Laden raid.

Design

The Z-20 is based on the proven 1970s S-70/UH-60 Black Hawk, which China acquired in the 1980s. Pakistan may also have allowed China to examine wreckage from the US special forces Black Hawk abandoned during the assassination of Osama bin Laden on 1 May 2011. 

The helicopter uses fly-by-wire controls and a five-bladed main rotor; the Black Hawk has four blades. The tail-to-fuselage joint frame is more angular than the Black Hawk's, for greater lift, cabin capacity, and endurance. The fairings behind the engine exhausts and on the spine are likely for satellite communications or the BeiDou satellite navigation system.

The Z-20 is believed to be powered by the domestic WZ-10 turboshaft engine providing 1,700-2,000 shp of power, comparable to the latest iteration of the Black Hawk engine, the GE T700-701D. The Z-20 also incorporates new technologies that reduce weight and improve lift as well as cutting edge de-icing tech on the rotor-blades. These features enable it to conduct operations at altitudes above 4,000 m (13,200 ft).

Variants 
Z-20
Base transport variant. Can be equipped with up to 8 KD-10 missiles.
Z-20S
Multi-role utility variant. Equipped with FLIR. Can be equipped with up to 8 KD-10 missiles.
Z-20F
Naval ASW variant. Equipped with surface radar under nose, pylon for torpedoes, dipping sonar under belly and bubble window for observation.

Operators 

People's Liberation Army Ground Force - 60
People's Liberation Army Navy
People's Armed Police

Specifications (estimated)

See also

References

Military helicopters
Harbin aircraft
2010s Chinese helicopters
2010s Chinese military utility aircraft
Aircraft first flown in 2013